Salem School may refer to:

in Baden-Württemberg in Germany

Schule Schloss Salem, an elite boarding school founded in 1920 by Kurt Hahn

in Ghana in West Africa

Salem School, Osu, boy's boarding middle school in the suburb of Osu, Accra in Ghana

in the United States (by state)
Salem School (Naugatuck, Connecticut), listed on the National Register of Historic Places in New Haven County, Connecticut
Old Salem School, Macon, Mississippi, listed on the National Register of Historic Places in Noxubee County, Mississippi
Salem School (Red Oak, Virginia), listed on the National Register of Historic Places in Charlotte County, Virginia

See also
Salem Academy (disambiguation)
Salem High School (disambiguation)